Oleksandr Leonidovych Kolchynskyy (20 February 1955 – 16 July 2002) was a Soviet Ukrainian heavyweight Greco-Roman wrestler of Jewish-Ukrainian descent. He won Olympic gold medals in 1976 and 1980 and a world title in 1978, placing second in 1975, 1977 and 1979. Most Olympic wins came by way of pin.

Career
Kolchynskiy took up wrestling in 1966, and in 1974 was included to the Soviet national team after winning his first Soviet title. He won five more national championships in a row in 1976–80 and would be a favorite at the 1984 Olympics, considering that he previously defeated the would-be 1984 Olympic champion Jeff Blatnick in the finale of the 1980 World Cup. But the Games were eventually boycotted by the Soviet Union, ending any aspirations for Kolchinsky participation.

Viktor Igumenov, Soviet National Team Coach, later told that Kolchinsky was rowdy and extremely lazy athlete, zero-discipline hooligan with little or no motivation for sports, but at the same time an remarkably talented wrestler, with springy and flexible body, gifted with a lightweight speed packed in a large, heavyweight frame.

Retirement and later years
Kolchynsky retired in the early 1980s, and in 1983 moved to Tashkent, Uzbek SSR, where he opened a small sewing shop together with his wife. Later he became involved with Ukrainian organized crime and in 1994 was sentenced to seven years of prison for extortion. He was paroled in 1996 and became a wrestling coach for teenagers. He died of a heart attack in 2002, aged 47. Earlier in 1998, an annual Greco-Roman wrestling tournament in his honor has been launched in his native city of Kyiv.

References

External links

1955 births
2002 deaths
Sportspeople from Kyiv
Soviet male sport wrestlers
Soviet people of Jewish descent
Olympic wrestlers of the Soviet Union
Wrestlers at the 1976 Summer Olympics
Wrestlers at the 1980 Summer Olympics
Ukrainian male sport wrestlers
Olympic gold medalists for the Soviet Union
Olympic medalists in wrestling
Medalists at the 1980 Summer Olympics
Medalists at the 1976 Summer Olympics
Ukrainian gangsters
Sportspeople convicted of crimes
Honoured Masters of Sport of the USSR
Recipients of the Honorary Diploma of the Cabinet of Ministers of Ukraine
Recipients of the Order of the Red Banner of Labour
European Wrestling Championships medalists
World Wrestling Championships medalists